Marmaton Township may refer to the following townships in the United States:

 Marmaton Township, Bourbon County, Kansas
 Marmaton Township, Allen County, Kansas